Journeyman is a 2017 British drama film written and directed by Paddy Considine. The film stars Paddy Considine and Jodie Whittaker, with Paul Popplewell, Anthony Welsh and Tony Pitts.

Plot
Matty Burton is the ageing Middleweight boxing champion of the world, living a comfortable life with his wife Emma and daughter, Mia. Scheduled to defend his title against the controversial and outspoken Andre Bryte, Bryte is brash and disrespectful towards Burton in the press conference, and continues antagonizing him in subsequent interviews. The resulting match is gruelling for Burton, as he takes several hard shots to the head, but ultimately retains his belt after winning by decision.

Returning home, Burton suddenly begins suffering from severe headaches, and subsequently passes out on his living room floor, a delayed reaction to the punishment he received in the fight. Returning from hospital after a brain surgery, Matty's personality and physical abilities have deteriorated, suffering from dementia. Despite Emma's best efforts, Matty becomes increasingly difficult to care for; he suffers from violent outbursts, at one point striking her, and even putting Mia in an inactive washing machine to drown out her cries, causing Emma to leave him. Distressed by the revelation of who he once was, Matty attempts suicide, but survives his fall into the water and returns to his old gym, where he is promptly taken to hospital. Matty's friends Richie and Jackie begin helping Matty, ashamed that they hadn't visited him during the surgery, and his condition slowly begins to improve. He is later visited by Bryte, deeply repentant for what happened, with Matty forgiving him.

Matty ultimately attends a ceremony dedicated to him, where he gives a speech thanking those who have helped him in his recovery, and stating that he wants to live for his wife and child. Emma later approaches Matty, and the two emotionally reconcile. With his condition improved drastically, Matty returns to his gym as a trainer, his life renewed.

Cast
Paddy Considine as Matty Burton
Jodie Whittaker as Emma Burton
Anthony Welsh as Andre Bryte
Paul Popplewell as Jackie		
Tony Pitts as Richie

Kell Brook and Steve Bunce have cameos as themselves, while Brendan Ingle plays Robin Burton, the protagonist's father.

Release
The film was released in the UK on 30 March 2018.

Reception
On review aggregator website Rotten Tomatoes, the film holds an approval rating of 85% based on 39 reviews, and an average rating of 6.8/10. The site's consensus reads: "Journeyman finds writer-director-star Paddy Considine gutting out a boxing drama whose familiar narrative contours are countered by an array of powerful performances". Robbie Collin of The Telegraph gave it four out of five stars, dubbing the film 'heartbreaking'. Empire also gave the film four out of five stars, describing Considine as 'astonishing as a broken man attempting to put himself back together'. Guy Lodge of Variety found it a lesser film than Tyrannosaur, but praised the acting.

Influence
Former UFC Middleweight Champion Michael Bisping said watching Journeyman while on a flight, and his desire not to become like the character in the film, led to his retirement from the sport. “It’s been a hell of a ride, it’s been amazing, but I knew watching that movie, I’m like, yeah, this is it, this is the end,” Bisping said. “I can’t do this to my family anymore. I can’t do it to myself. Obviously my eye is in terrible shape, and my good eye, I’m having a couple of issues with that as well. Nobody wants to go blind, and a friend of mine as well said, ‘You know if you went blind, you would give any amount of money in the world and get your sight back,’ and of course you would, so it just isn't worth it.”

Awards and nominations

References

External links
 
 

2017 films
2010s sports drama films
British sports drama films
British boxing films
2017 drama films
2010s English-language films
2010s British films